The 2016 season for  began in January at the Tour de San Luis. Fortuneo–Vital Concept is a French-registered UCI Professional Continental cycling team that participated in road bicycle racing events on the UCI Continental Circuits and when selected as a wildcard to UCI ProTour events.

Team roster

Riders who joined the team for the 2016 season

Riders who left the team during or after the 2015 season

Season victories

Footnotes

References

External links
 

2016 road cycling season by team
2016 in French sport
Arkéa–Samsic